Adhavan Rajamohan (born 21 February 1993) is a Swedish football midfielder who plays for Degerfors IF.

References

1993 births
Living people
Swedish footballers
Association football midfielders
Akropolis IF players
Degerfors IF players
Ettan Fotboll players
Superettan players
Allsvenskan players